The Wolf Dogs Nagoya are a men's volleyball team based in Inazawa, Aichi, Japan. They play in the V.Premier League.

History
The club was founded in 1961 by the workers of Toyoda Gosei, one of the Toyota Motor group companies. They initially played nine-player volleyball but switched to six-player volleyball in 1982. They were promoted to the Regional League in 1984 and to the second top-level national league in 1993. They were promoted to V. League in 1998 for the first time.

In 2019, Team changed its name from Toyoda Gosei Trefuerza into Wolfdogs Nagoya.

Current roster
The following is team roster of Season 2022-2023
{|class="wikitable sortable" style="font-size:100%; text-align:center;"
! colspan="6"| Team roster – Season 2022-2023|-
!style="width:4em; color:red; background-color:black"|No.
!style="width:10em; color:red; background-color:black"|Name
!style="width:14em; color:red; background-color:black"|Date of birth
!style="width:8em; color:red; background-color:black"|Height
!style="width:8em; color:red; background-color:black"|Position
|-
| ||style="text-align:left;"|Shuzo Yamada ||style="text-align:right;"| || ||Outside Hitter
|-
| ||style="text-align:left;"|Tetsu Yamachika ||style="text-align:right;"| || ||Middle Blocker
|-
| ||style="text-align:left;"|Bartosz Kurek (c)||style="text-align:right;"| || ||Opposite Hitter
|-
| ||style="text-align:left;"|Yamato Fushimi ||style="text-align:right;"| || ||Middle Blocker
|-
| ||style="text-align:left;"|Issei Maeda ||style="text-align:right;"| || ||Setter
|-
| ||style="text-align:left;"|Hirotaka Kon ||style="text-align:right;"| || ||Middle Blocker
|-
| ||style="text-align:left;"|Dongchen Wang ||style="text-align:right;"| || ||Middle Blocker
|-
| ||style="text-align:left;"|Kenta Takanashi ||style="text-align:right;"| || ||Outside Hitter
|-
|11|| style="text-align:left;" |Ryota Denda|| style="text-align:right;" |||||Middle Blocker
|-
|13||style="text-align:left;" |Takaki Koyama||align=right|||||Outside Hitter 
|-
|14||align=left|Ryosuke Tsubakiyama||align=right|||||Opposite Spiker 
|-
|16||align=left|Nakano Yamato||align=right|||||Setter
|-
|17||align=left|Kenta Ichikawa||align=right|||||Libero
|-
|19||align=left|Ryo Takahashi||align=right|||||Outside Hitter 
|-
|20||align=left|Taichi Kawaguchi||align=right|||||Libero 
|-
|21||align=left|Motoki Eiro||align=right|||||Setter 
|-
|23||align=left|Masato Katsuoka||align=right||||| Outside Hitter
|-
|24||align=left|Tomohiro Ogawa||align=right|||||Libero
|-
|26||align=left|Akito Yamazaki||align=right|||||Outside Hitter
|-
|colspan=5 |Head coach:  Valerio Baldovin
|}

Honours
Japan Volleyball League/V.League/V.Premier League
Winners (1): 2015–16
Runners-up (2): 2016–17, 2017–18, 2021–22
Kurowashiki All Japan Volleyball Championship
Runners-up (1): 2007
Domestic Sports Festival
Winners (1): 2012

League results
 Champion'''   Runner-up

Notable players
 (2005-2006)
 (2014-2019)
 (2021-present)

References

External links
Official website 

Japanese volleyball teams
Volleyball clubs established in 1961
Tourist attractions in Aichi Prefecture
Toyota